Ennis is the county town of County Clare, in the mid-west of Ireland. The town lies on the River Fergus, north of where the river widens and enters the Shannon Estuary. Ennis is the largest town in County Clare, with a population of 25,276, making it the 6th largest town, and 12th largest urban settlement, as of 2016.

Ennis has had considerable success in the  Irish Tidy Towns competition. In 2005 and 2021, the town was named Ireland's tidiest town, and was named Ireland's tidiest large urban centre on multiple occasions.

History

The name Ennis derives from the Irish word "Inis", meaning "island". The history of Ennis is closely linked with the O'Brien dynasty, descendants of Brian Boru. In the 12th century, the O'Briens, the Kings of Thomond, left their seat of power in Limerick and built a Clonroad Fort in 1210, a royal residence on the banks of the Fergus. In 1240, following the arrival of Franciscan monks, King Donnchadh O'Brien ordered the construction of an extensive church which he later donated to the Friars. The Friary quickly expanded becoming a centre for theological studies, and by 1375 had 600 students and 350 Friars in residence. As the Friary expanded, so too did the surrounding area, with the town becoming a religious centre until the Dissolution of the Monasteries. Despite its official closure in 1540, the Friary continued to operate in a limited way until 1690, remaining the last school of Catholic Theology to survive the Reformation.

When Clare became a county under the rule of Elizabeth I in 1586, Ennis was chosen as its administrative centre and capital because of its central location and its association with the Earls of Thomond. Ennis received a grant to hold fairs and markets in 1610 and later a Charter for a Corporation with a Provost, Free Burgesses, Commonalty and a Town Clerk.

In the colonial period, a number of landmark structures were constructed, including the Mill and Courthouse. The town contains a number of old military barracks, most notably the Old Military Barracks on the Kilrush road. Many locals served in the British Army in the First World War. The Clare Road and Clonroad areas contain terraced cottages built in the early 20th century to house soldiers. On Station Road, then called Jail Road, a gaol once stood.

As its formation was monastic and not defensive, Ennis never had town walls and instead grew as place of commerce and trade. Over the centuries the market town slowly expanded, and eventually developed as a small manufacturing and distribution centre with commodities moved by river to the port at Clarecastle for shipping abroad. Local industries included textile and clothing manufacturing, the milling of corn and flour, as well as brewing of beer and distillation of whiskey with evidence of these industries still present in the town. The 1845 Famine and its aftermath had a substantial effect on the town with the population declining by over 20% because of famine, disease and emigration.

Ennis was governed by a corporation from the early 17th century. It was a parliamentary borough to the Irish House of Commons until 1801, and was given continued representation at Westminister from 1801 to 1885. The borough corporation was dissolved by the Municipal Corporations (Ireland) Act 1840. It was later granted town commissioners under the Towns Improvement (Ireland) Act 1854, which was converted to an urban district under the Local Government (Ireland) Act 1898, and a town council under the Local Government Act 2001. The Local Government Reform Act 2014 dissolved the town council with the creation of Ennis Municipal District under the authority of Clare County Council.

Politically, Ennis was long a Fianna Fáil stronghold. However, in the 2009 local elections, the party was reduced to just one member out of nine on Ennis Town Council. A monument to Éamon de Valera, founder of the party and former President of Ireland, stands outside Ennis Courthouse.

The River Fergus runs through the middle of Ennis and is a well-known trout and salmon fishery. At one time, small sailing boats made their way up river from the Shannon and berthed in the centre of the town at Woodquay. This area of the town along with Parnell Street and Mill Road was routinely susceptible to flooding, but the flood defence system put an end to the event in Parnell Street and the Mill Road areas, although in November 2009 other parts of the town experienced severe flooding. A new pedestrian bridge, Harmony Row Bridge,  was built over the river Fergus in June 2009.

Heritage and economy

Ennis continued to expand in the following centuries, mainly as a market town and later as a manufacturing and distributing centre. Many commodities were conveyed by river to Clarecastle for shipment abroad.

Ennis is a historically important market town. The market square is still home to market stalls on each Saturday throughout the year, although with the rise in the town's commercial retail sector it has shifted from agricultural produce to mainly textiles and home hardware. The market also has an organic farming element.

The town centre consists of medieval narrow streets and laneways, overshadowed by structures built over the last thousand years. Of the main thoroughfares, Parnell Street has been pedestrianised, while the others, O'Connell Street, Bindon Street and Abbey Street, are one way. The Cathedral of Saint Peter and Saint Paul is on the fringe of the old town centre.

Ennis serves as a major regional hub for County Clare. Among its emergency services, it contains the Ennis Hospital, the HQ of the Clare Divisional Garda, the Clare Fire Brigade and Civil Defence. Ennis also includes many relief organisations, such as The Samaritans, Clare Care and St. Vincent De Paul. Among its civil services, it contains Clare County Council, as well as Social and Family affairs.

Ennis has been a centre for Irish Traditional Music, and since 1974 has hosted the Fleadh Nua in late May each year, the second-largest traditional music festival in Ireland. There are other traditional festivals held in the town as well such as the Ennis Trad Festival held annually in November.

Transport
Situated 14  km from Shannon Airport, Ennis is served by both bus and rail links to all major cities and towns in Ireland. The main bus depot is adjacent to the town's train station and both are about one kilometre from the town centre. Ennis railway station is on the Clon Road toward the east of the town, which links to the main N18 in either direction.

Bus services are provided to Shannon Airport, Galway, Limerick, Cork, Dublin and all routes in between and run nearly every hour. Shannon Airport is 15 minutes from Ennis, providing daily flights to European and US destinations.

The M18 motorway was extended from Ennis to Limerick in 2007. The section from Ennis to Gort was opened in 2010. The section between Gort and Claregalway was opened in 2017, offering a direct connection with Galway, Tuam and Athenry. 

Eighteen rail services per day are now provided to and from Limerick, from where connecting rail services are available to both Dublin Heuston and Cork. The Western Railway Corridor north of Ennis (to Athenry and Galway) reopened on 30 March 2010 with five return services daily. 

Ennis was formerly the starting point of the West Clare Railway, a narrow-gauge railway which ran from Ennis to Ennistymon, Milltown Malbay and onwards to the towns and villages along the West Clare coastline. Trains ran from the same railway station which is still used by mainline Irish railway services. The line was CIÉ's last narrow-gauge railway and finally closed in 1961, despite investment in new diesel trains in the early/mid-1950s.

Ennis railway station connects with Galway and with Limerick where onward trains run to Dublin, Cork via Limerick Junction (for connections to Tipperary, Cahir, Clonmel, Carrick-on-Suir and Waterford) and Mallow (for connections to Killarney and Tralee). Ennis is also served by local charity Clare bus which provides a fully wheelchair-accessible bus service around the Clare area.

Education

Primary Schools in Ennis include Ennis National School, established in 1897 (formerly Boys National School), Cloughleigh National School, Gaelscoil Mhichíl Cíosóg, Holy Family School, Scoil Chroist Rí, CBS and the multi-denominational Ennis Educate Together National School which opened in 1998. There are several secondary level schools in Ennis, including Rice College, Ennis Community College, Coláiste Muire, St. Flannan's College, and Gaelcholaiste an Chláir. Mid-West Management Training is a FETAC approved provider of further education and training up to Level 6 of the National Framework of Qualifications. The Ennis Business college is one of Ennis's third-level facilities. Limerick IT opened its Ennis campus in 2019. The IT merged with Athlone IT to become Technological University of the Shannon: Midlands Midwest, in October 2021.

Culture
Ennis is a stronghold of traditional music with many musicians in residence and regularly playing locally.
The Ennis Book Club Festival, in association with Clare County Library, runs annually on the first weekend in March. It attracts readers and authors from all over Ireland and beyond. Glór Theatre is a concert and events venue in the town centre.

In 2016 and 2017 Ennis hosted the Fleadh Cheoil na hÉireann music competition. It is the first time that the town has hosted the event since 1977.

Sports and leisure
Cusack Park on Francis Street in the town centre is the main county Gaelic Athletic Association (GAA) playing grounds and the home of Clare GAA. Ennis has numerous football clubs (soccer, GAA and rugby) that play in various leagues from schoolboys to senior.

There is ample car parking and the main building includes modern changing rooms, showers and toilets. Among the facilities available are four conventional playing pitches, full size all-weather floodlit playing pitch, a floodlit  synthetic running track and a purpose-built cross country running track. There is a children's playground and skateboard park and marked walks and trails throughout the woodland area. Ennis Leisure Centre has a fully equipped gym with a 25m pool, saunas etc. There are a number of hotels around Ennis that have their own leisure facilities including gyms and 15m to 20m pools.

Within the town, there are six adult soccer clubs (Avenue United, Lifford FC, Ennis Town, Turnpike Rovers, Hermitage FC and Ennis Dons FC), two adult GAA clubs (Éire Óg and The Banner GAA), and one rugby club (Ennis RFC).

International relations

Ennis is twinned with Phoenix, Arizona. Each summer an average of four 4th/5th year students partake in the Phoenix Youth Ambassador Program, which is facilitated by the city of Phoenix twinning committee and the Ennis Chamber of Commerce.

It is also twinned with the town of Saint-Paul-de-Fenouillet in southern France.
Ennis is also twinned with the town of Clare, South Australia and the city of Clare, Michigan, United States

Information Age Town
In September 1997, Ennis became Ireland's first and only Information Age Town. The town was greatly enhanced by the project's IR£15 million investment, which saw 4,200 computers provided to residents. A computer lab was provided for every school and every primary school classroom was provided with a computer. Elderly residents were given the chance to become computer users also as a result. The project also gave Ennis Ireland's first high-speed ISDN line infrastructure, which connected all the town's businesses together. Ennis was also used as a test site for VISA Cash, which allowed users to top up a Chip and PIN card with petty cash and purchase goods in local stores. Funding for the project ran out in 2000.

Tidy Town
In 2012, 2013 and 2021, Ennis won the Irish Tidy Towns Competition in the Large Urban Centre category.

Gallery

Notable people
James Bartholomew Blackwell, French Revolutionary soldier
Tony MacMahon, Irish button accordion player and radio and television broadcaster.
Thomas Dermody, 18th-century poet
Michael Enright, Democratic Left politician
Kieran Hanrahan, radio host and tenor banjo player who won the All-Ireland banjo championship at age 14
Maeve Kelly, novelist
Michael Houlihan, former President of the Law Society of Ireland
Des Lynam, Irish presenter on British television
Sean Matgamna, Trotskyist theorist
William Mulready, 19th-century genre painter
Máiréad Ní Ghráda, Irish playwright and poet
Matthew O'Brien, 19th-century mathematician
Daniel O'Connell, MP returned for the Clare electoral area, was known as "The Liberator" for his winning of Catholic Emancipation in 1829
Maura O'Connell, singer
Mick O'Dea, artist
Simone Kirby, actress
Denise Gough, actress and two-time Olivier award recipient (2016 and 2018)
Kelly Gough, actress
Mark O'Halloran, screenwriter
Dara O'Kearney, international ultramarathon runner and professional poker player
the Hon. Mr Justice Daniel O'Keeffe, former Judge of the High Court, currently Chairperson of the Standards in Public Office Commission
Susan O'Neill singer-songwriter
Marcus Paterson, eminent eighteenth-century lawyer and politician who became Chief Justice of the Irish Common Pleas
Johnny Patterson, (1840–1889) singer and composer (born in Feakle but raised in Ennis)
Harriet Smithson, actress and first wife of French composer Hector Berlioz
Patrick Walshe (born 1952), painter
Stephen Woulfe, Liberal politician who became Solicitor-General for Ireland in 1836 and as Attorney-General for Ireland in 1838; he became first Catholic to be Chief Baron of the Irish Exchequer
Thomas Flanagan, finder of the first gold in the immensely rich goldfield of Kalgoorlie, Western Australia in 1893.
Matthias Finucane, judge of the Court of Common Pleas (Ireland)

In popular culture
Ennis is referred to in James Joyce's Ulysses
Ennis is mentioned in the songs "Isobel" by British performer Dido, and "At The Ceili" by Celtic Woman

Townlands and civil parishes

The town of Ennis is situated in parts of the civil parishes of Doora, Drumcliff, Kilraghtis and Templemaley. Townlands are:
Doora: Ballaghboy,  Bunnow,  Gaurus, and  Knockanean
Drumcliff: Cahircalla Beg,  Cahircalla More,  Claureen,  Cloghleagh,  Clonroad Beg,  Clonroad More,  Drumbiggil,   Drumcliff,   Lifford,   Loughvella, and Shanvogh
Kilraghtis: Rosslevan 
Templemaley: Ballycorey,  Cappahard,  Dulick,  Knockaderry, and  Knockanoura

See also
List of abbeys and priories in Ireland (County Clare)
 List of towns and villages in Ireland
 Roslevan, Ennis

References

External links

Official Ennis website
County Clare Library – History of Ennis
 The Tidy Towns of Ireland "Celebrating 50 years"

 

 
County towns in the Republic of Ireland
Towns and villages in County Clare
Parishes of the Roman Catholic Diocese of Killaloe